The Prince Chap is a 1920 American silent drama film directed by William C. deMille and written by Olga Printzlau based upon the play of the same name by Edward Peple. The film stars Thomas Meighan, Charles Ogle, Kathlyn Williams, Casson Ferguson, Ann Forrest, Peaches Jackson, and Mae Giraci. The film was released in August 1920, by Paramount Pictures.

Plot
As described in a film magazine, William Peyton (Meighan), an artist occupying a poor apartment in the Latin quarter of London with his servant Runion (Ogle), is prevailed by a poor artists' model (Hart) to take her child and keep it upon her death. William agrees and raises Claudia as if she was his own daughter. His fiancée Alice Travers (Williams), hearing Claudia call him "pappa", misunderstands the situation and breaks their engagement. After several years, William has become prosperous and Claudia grows into womanhood. Jack, the Earl of Huntington (Ferguson), a fellow artist and friend of William, falls in love with Claudia (Lee) and asks for her hand in marriage. She refuses him. Alice, now a widow, returns to renew their friendship, but William's love for her is dead. He loves only Claudia and finds that his love is reciprocated.

Cast
Thomas Meighan as William Peyton
Charles Ogle as Runion
Kathlyn Williams as Alice Travers
Casson Ferguson as Jack, Earl of Huntington
Ann Forrest as Phoebe Puckers
Peaches Jackson as Claudia (age 4)
Mae Giraci as Claudia (age 8)
Lila Lee as Claudia (age 18)
Lillian Leighton as Aunt
Bertram Johns as Ballington
Florence Hart as Claudia's Mother
Theodore Kosloff as Yadder
Clarence Geldart as Helmer
Yvonne Gardelle

Preservation status
It is not known whether the film currently survives.

References

External links 

 
Peple, Edward (1904), The Prince Chap, a Comedy in Three Acts, New York: Samuel French, Publishers, on the Internet Archive

1920 films
1920s English-language films
Silent American drama films
1920 drama films
Paramount Pictures films
Films directed by William C. deMille
American black-and-white films
American silent feature films
1920s American films